Josef Herman  (3 January 1911 – 19 February 2000), was a highly regarded Polish-British painter who influenced contemporary art, particularly in the United Kingdom. His work often depicted workers as its subject and was inherently political. He was among more than a generation of eastern European Jewish artists who emigrated to escape persecution and worked abroad. For eleven years he lived in Ystradgynlais, a mining community in South Wales.

Biography
Herman was born in Warsaw into a Polish-Jewish family, on 3 January 1911. He attended the Warsaw School of Art, where he trained as a typesetter and graphic designer and then for two years worked briefly as a graphic artist. In 1938 at the age of 27, Herman left Poland for Brussels. He was introduced to many of the prominent artists then working in the city.  After the beginning of World War II and the German invasion of Belgium, he escaped to France and then to Great Britain.

He first lived in Glasgow, where he met fellow artist Jankel Adler and between 1940 and 1943 he contributed to a remarkable wartime artistic renaissance in the city. He then moved to London, where he met numerous other European émigrés, such as the Hungarian Michael Peto, with whom he became friends. When Peto decided to go into photography after the war, Herman encouraged him in his new endeavour and supported his progress as a photojournalist. In 1942 Herman learned through the Red Cross that his entire family had perished in the Warsaw Ghetto.

In 1943 he held his first London exhibition with L. S. Lowry. Herman's own style was bold and distinctive, involving strong shapes with minimal detail. He continued to work up to his death in 2000.

Herman studied working people as the subjects of his art, including grape pickers, fishermen and, most notably, coal miners. The latter became a particular interest for Herman during the eleven years that he lived in Ystradgynlais, a mining community in South Wales, beginning in 1944. He became part of the community, where he was fondly nicknamed "Joe Bach" (Little Joe). Among his creative collaborators and friends in Wales was the artist Will Roberts, who lived in Neath. Herman is quoted as saying: "I stayed here because I found ALL I required. I arrived a stranger for a fortnight. The fortnight became eleven years."

When commissioned in 1951 to paint a mural for the Festival of Britain, Herman took coal miners as his subject. His work Miners (1951) showed six men resting above ground after their work.  Herman said, "I think it is one of my key pictures and the most important one I did in Wales."  The mural is held in the permanent collection of the Glynn Vivian Art Gallery, affiliated with the Swansea Museum.

Some of Herman's work was collected by the Davies sisters, British art patrons and collectors in Wales, as part of their 20th-century holdings.  They bequeathed their joint collection of 260 works, particularly strong in Impressionist and post-Impressionist paintings and sculptures, to the National Museum Wales in the mid-20th century, greatly expanding its range.

Leaving Wales in 1955 because his health was affected by the damp climate, Herman lived briefly in Spain and then in London. All the same, he was awarded the Gold Medal for Fine Art at the 1962 National Eisteddfod of Wales.

In 1955 Herman moved to Suffolk with his partner, Nini Ettlinger, whom he married in 1961. The death of their young daughter prompted them to move away and from 1972 Herman lived in the house in West London where he died in February 2000.

In 1981 Herman was awarded an OBE for services to British Art and was elected to the Royal Academy of Arts in 1990.

Legacy and honours
2004, the Josef Herman Foundation was established in Ystradgynlais, to honour the artist and his legacy, and encourage study of his work, as well as arts initiatives in South Wales.
2010, Michael Waters' play, The Secret of Belonging, about Josef Herman and his years in Ystradgynlais, was produced by the National Theatre Wales.  The play included a contemporary folk-influenced score by Swansea musician and composer Andy Jones, and it was performed by the Antic Theatre. They first performed at Swansea, then took the play on a tour of South Wales during April/May 2010.

Bibliography 
Herman, J. (2002) Related Twilights: Notes from an Artist's Diary. Seren, Bridgend
Bohm-Duchen, M. (2009) The Art and Life of Josef Herman. Lund Humpries, Surrey.
Heller, R.  (1998) Josef Herman: The work is the Life. Momentum, London.
Herman, N. (1996) Josef Hermann: A Working Life. Quartet Books.
Herman, J. (1988) Note From A Welsh Diary. Free Association Books, London.
Herman, J. (1975) Related Twilights: Notes from an Artist's Diary. Robson, London.

Selected exhibitions 
2014–15 Refiguring the 50s: Joan Eardley, Sheila Fell, Eva Frankfurter, Josef Herman and L.S. Lowry, Ben Uri Gallery, London
2009 Josef Herman: The Art & Life, Flowers Central, London
2000 The Work is the Life, Flowers East, London
1994 Related Twilights, Fifty years of Drawing and Painting (1944 – 94), Angela Flowers Gallery, London
1989 Retrospective Exhibition, National Museum of Wales, Cardiff
1989 Recent works 1984–89 and Homage to the Women of Greenham Common, Angela Flowers Gallery, London
1980 4th retrospective exhibition, Camden Arts Centre, London
1975 3rd retrospective exhibition, Glasgow
1957 Recent works, Roland, Browse and Delbanco. 
1956 2nd retrospective exhibition, Whitechapel Art Gallery, London Drawings,
1955 1st retrospective exhibition, Wakefield City Art Gallery
1954 Geffrye Museum, London, exhibition with Henry Moore
1949 Ben Uri Gallery, London, exhibition with Martin Bloch
1943 1st solo exhibition in London, Reid Gallery, London
1943 Lefevre, London, exhibition with L.S. Lowry
1932 1st exhibition in Warsaw

References

Further reading
Roese, Herbert E. (2007), Josef Herman's influence on other painters, David Jones Journal Vol.VI No.1&2, pp. 138–145
MacDougall, Sarah, (2014), Refiguring the 50s : Joan Eardley, Sheila Fell, Eva Frankfurther, Josef Herman, L S Lowry, Ben Uri Gallery and Museum

External links
Herman's work is held in many major public and private art collections.

 
 14 artworks by Josef Herman at the Ben Uri site
The Tate Gallery in London has an extensive collection of Herman's paintings and drawings.  Many are not on permanent display, but they may be seen on line at: The Tate Gallery.
A smaller collection is held by the National Museum of Wales.
Josef Herman (1911-2000) at boundarygallery.com

1911 births
2000 deaths
Jewish painters
20th-century Polish Jews
Welsh Eisteddfod Gold Medal winners
20th-century Polish painters
20th-century Polish male artists
Royal Academicians
Polish emigrants to the United Kingdom
Polish male painters